Marcelo Alejandro Delgado (born 24 March 1973) is a retired Argentine footballer, best known for his nickname "Chelo". He usually played as a deep-lying forward. He has been capped for Argentina and played at the 1996 Olympic Games and the 1998 FIFA World Cup. He is well known for his technical ability and finishing.

He played for several clubs including Rosario Central, Racing Club, Boca Juniors, Barcelona SC and Mexican Cruz Azul. His nephew, Lucas, is a professional footballer.

Coaching and later career
In the summer 2011, Delgado was appointed assistant coach to Raúl Alfredo Cascini at Los Andes. The duo resigned on 9 September 2012.

In 2013, Delgado had a short spell at amateur club For ever. In 2016, Delgado played a few matches for his childhood club Defensores de Villa.

On 19 December 2019, when his close friend and former pro-player Juan Román Riquelme was appointed vice-president and head of the football department of Boca Juniors, Delgado also joined the club as a member of Boca Juniors Soccer Council.

Career statistics

International

Honours
 Boca Juniors
Argentine Primera División: Apertura 2000, Apertura 2005, Clausura 2006
Copa Libertadores: 2000, 2001, 2003
Copa Intercontinental: 2000
Copa Sudamericana: 2005
Recopa Sudamericana: 2005

References

External links
 

1973 births
Living people
Argentine people of Spanish descent
People from San Lorenzo Department
Argentine footballers
Association football forwards
Rosario Central footballers
Cruz Azul footballers
Racing Club de Avellaneda footballers
Boca Juniors footballers
Club Atlético Belgrano footballers
Barcelona S.C. footballers
Argentine Primera División players
Liga MX players
Ecuadorian Serie A players
Argentina youth international footballers
Argentina under-20 international footballers
Olympic footballers of Argentina
Argentina international footballers
Footballers at the 1996 Summer Olympics
Copa Libertadores-winning players
1997 Copa América players
1998 FIFA World Cup players
Olympic silver medalists for Argentina
Olympic medalists in football
Medalists at the 1996 Summer Olympics
Argentine expatriate footballers
Argentine expatriate sportspeople in Mexico
Argentine expatriate sportspeople in Ecuador
Expatriate footballers in Mexico
Expatriate footballers in Ecuador
Sportspeople from Santa Fe Province